Goedertius is an extinct genus of river dolphin from the early Miocene (Burdigalian) Nye Formation of Oregon.

Description
Goedertius is distinguished from other allodelphinids by a depression on the posterior part of the rostrum, smaller nasal bones, wider 
dorsal opening of mesorostral canal on posterior part of rostrum, and dorsal exposures  of frontals at cranial  vertex smaller.

References

Fossil taxa described in 2016
Miocene cetaceans
Extinct mammals of North America
River dolphins